KLBF (89.1 FM, "Faith Radio") is a radio station licensed to serve Lincoln, North Dakota, serving the Bismarck-Mandan area. The station is owned by the University of Northwestern - St Paul. It airs a Christian talk/music format.

The station was assigned the KVLQ call letters by the Federal Communications Commission on March 28, 2003 and aired the K-LOVE network until 2008. From 2008 to November 2010 the station was branded as "God's Country Radio" airing a Christian country and Southern Gospel.

"The University of Northwestern-St. Paul is poised to bring its "Faith Radio" network to the Bismarck area after buying a station from the Educational Media Foundation. Northwestern will pay $50,000 for KLBF/89.1 (Lincoln-Bismarck), which is EMF's third signal in the area. A main studio waiver request filed with the FCC requests that KLBF become a satellite of KTIS/900 (Minneapolis), which is the flagship of the "Faith Radio" Christian talk and preaching network. Bismarck would be the only community where Northwestern offers "Faith Radio" but not a local Contemporary Christian format. Christian music formats are already available locally from longtime local Christian outlet KNDR-FM/104.7 and EMF's "K-Love" and "Air-1" networks. (4/26/2017)"

"KLBF/89.1 (Lincoln-Bismarck) has returned to the air and is now carrying Christian Talk and Teaching from the Faith Radio Network. The change follows University of Northwestern-St. Paul, which owns the Faith Radio Network, buying KLBF from the Educational Media Foundation. Bismarck is the westernmost city where the network is heard and is one of the few markets where Northwestern operates a Faith Radio station but not a local Contemporary Christian format. (10/2/2017)"

References

External links
KTIS-AM website

LBF
Burleigh County, North Dakota
Radio stations established in 2006
2006 establishments in North Dakota
LBF
Northwestern Media